St Cuthbert's College is a private (independent) Presbyterian-based day and boarding school for girls aged 4 to 18 (Years 0 to 13), located in Epsom, Auckland, New Zealand.

The school was established in 1915 and has a roll of approximately 1300 students and is widely regarded as one of the best academically performing schools in New Zealand. In 2015, Metro Magazine stated that "the top academic results in Auckland, every year, are scored by St Cuthbert’s College" and the school has been awarded the title of Metro Magazine's Highest-Ranked Auckland Secondary School for Academic Achievement in 2013, 2014 (when the equivalent of 53 per cent of the Year 13 roll gained scholarships), 2015, 2016, 2017, 2018, 2020 and 2022.

The school is affiliated with the Alliance of Girls' Schools Australasia (AGSA), the New Zealand Boarding Schools' Association (NZBSA), Independent Schools of New Zealand (ISNZ), and is an overseas member of the Association of Heads of Independent Schools of Australia (AHISA).

The school offers both the International Baccalaureate diplomas and the national NCEA qualification.

History

The college was established as the Auckland Presbyterian College for Ladies Ltd in 1915, when a group of Presbyterian elders purchased Mt Eden Collegiate, a private school for girls, and appointed Miss Isobel Macdonald as the school's first principal. Miss Macdonald chose the motto, "By Love, Serve", and renamed the school St Cuthbert's College as the Trust Board suggested that a shorter and more distinctive name was required. The school is named after the Northumbrian monk-bishop Saint Cuthbert and, since 1918, it has celebrated St Cuthbert's Day annually in March.

In 1925, the college moved to its present site in Epsom. In 1932, three school houses were established, Dunblane, Elgin and Melrose, each named after places of significance in the life of St Cuthbert.

In 1936, the winter uniform was changed to Black Watch tartan, after the then principal, Lavinia Clouston, had seen the uniform at the Presbyterian Ladies' College, Sydney. Black Watch tartan also has been the summer uniform since 1966.

School motto 
The St Cuthbert's College motto is "By Love, Serve". The motto was chosen to encourage students to share, respect the needs of others, accept different viewpoints and to live peacefully.

The school verse comes from 1 Corinthians 13 chapters 1–13 and is consistent with "By Love, Serve", and students are constantly reminded to be "By Love, Serve".

Boarding 
St Cuthbert's College accepts both day students and boarding students. Boarding students from Years 7 to 13 live in one of St. Cuthbert's three boarding houses: Dunblane, Elgin or Melrose. The boarding community at St Cuthbert's College is very diverse. Boarders come from Asia, the Pacific Islands and a range of other overseas locations, as well as from both urban and rural New Zealand.  An increasing number of boarders are local students living between Karaka and the North Shore.

Curriculum

Academic
The college offers both the NCEA and the IB qualifications.

In 1999 a Thinking Skills programme was introduced based on Art Costa's Habits of Mind. Senior management credit this programme for the college's continuing ranking as one of New Zealand's top schools.

Physical education 
Physical education is compulsory for all students from Years 1 to 11. Students are also given the opportunity to pitch themselves against other top athletes in local, regional and national tournaments as part of the college's Athlete Pathway Programme.

Over 90 per cent of senior students participate in extra-curricular sporting activities.

Kahunui 
In Year 10, the students take part in a four-week experience at Kahunui, a large outdoor living space in the Bay of Plenty bush, where the girls participate in physical activities as well as academic work that is taught by practical applications (e.g. maths is covered in budgeting and English through creative writing journal entries).

During their time at Kahunui, the girls are divided into groups of eight students and they are expected to live in and manage their own residence. The outdoor programme includes overnight sea kayaking and tramping trips.

Headmistresses/Principal
 Isobel MacDonald 1915-1921
 Lavinia Clouston 1921-1948
 Violet Wood 1949-1968
 O.J. Holland 1969-1989
 Frances J. Compton 1989-1995
 Lynda J. Reid 1996-2016
 Roz Mexted 2017
 Justine Mahon 2018–present

Notable alumnae

Alumnae of St Cuthbert's College are commonly referred to as Old Girls, and may elect to join the school's alumnae association, the Old Girls' Association. Some notable St Cuthbert's Old Girls include:
 Bianca Babarich-Bacher – Joint winner, New Zealand Young Sailor of the year, Women's 420 sailing world champion and Halberg finalist.
 Alexandra Brewis Slade – anthropologist/social scientist.
 Christine Fletcher – former Member of Parliament for Epsom and Mayor of Auckland
 Philippa Gower – World Record holder and Olympic backstroker in the 1950s
 Julia King – field hockey player, member of Black Sticks Women (2011–)
 Roseanne Liang – film director
 Vicki Lin – presenter on Studio 2
 Katherine Faith (Willow) Macky – one of New Zealand's leading composers of folk-style music and songs (also attended Iona College)
 Stacey Michelsen – field hockey player, member of Black Sticks Women (2009–) (also attended Kamo High School)
 Kim Noakes – New Zealand Black Sticks
 Dr Margaret Orbell - author, editor and academic
 Suji Park – Korean-New Zealand artist
 Polly Powrie – sailor, Olympic gold medallist (2012 London)
 Lucy Talbot – field hockey player, member of Black Sticks Women (2009–)
 Rose Carlyle – author
 Renee Liang - paediatrician, poet, essayist, short story writer, playwright, librettist, theatre producer and medical researcher
 Pamela Allen – author and winner of the Margaret Mahy Medal for children's literature
 Ann Gluckman - author, travel writer, and copresident of the Auckland Council for Christians and Jews 
 Katie Doar - New Zealand field hockey player, member of Black Sticks Women- 2019
 Madison Doar - New Zealand field hockey player, member of Black Sticks Women- 2017
 Sulu Tone-Fitzpatrick - New Zealand Netball player, member of the Silver Ferns 2011, 2018 - present
 Louise Wallace - New Zealand television presenter, actress, and director

Cultural references
In the bro'Town première episode "The Weakest Link" (2004), one of the schools competing in the high school quiz challenge is named "Saint Cuthersan's College", a combination of both St Cuthbert's and the nearby Diocesan School for Girls.

See also
 List of schools in New Zealand
 List of boarding schools

References

External links
 St Cuthbert's College Website

Boarding schools in New Zealand
Educational institutions established in 1915
Girls' schools in New Zealand
Presbyterian schools in New Zealand
Primary schools in Auckland
Secondary schools in Auckland
Alliance of Girls' Schools Australasia
1915 establishments in New Zealand